The 2015 FIBA Americas Under-16 Championship was the men's international basketball competition that was held in Bahia Blanca, Argentina from 10–14 June 2015.

First round
All times are local (UTC−3).

Group A

Group B

Final round

Classification 5–8

Semifinals

Final classification games

Seventh place game

Fifth place game

Bronze medal game

Final

Awards

Final ranking

References

External links
2015 FIBA Americas U16 Championship

FIBA Americas Under-16 Championship
2014–15 in South American basketball
2014–15 in North American basketball
International basketball competitions hosted by Argentina
2014–15 in Argentine basketball
Youth sport in Argentina